Zuleikha Maharram gizi Hasanova (1923 – ?) was a Soviet-Azerbaijani politician (Communist) who served as Minister of Public Services in 1974–1983.

References 

1923 births
20th-century Azerbaijani women politicians
20th-century Azerbaijani politicians
Soviet women in politics
Azerbaijani communists
Women government ministers of Azerbaijan